Physically based rendering (PBR) is a  computer graphics approach that seeks to render images in a way that models the flow of light in the real world. Many PBR pipelines aim to achieve photorealism.  Feasible and quick approximations of the bidirectional reflectance distribution function and rendering equation are of mathematical importance in this field. Photogrammetry may be used to help discover and encode accurate optical properties of materials. PBR principles may be implemented in real-time applications using Shaders or offline applications using Ray tracing (graphics) or Path tracing.

History

Starting in the 1980s, a number of rendering researchers worked on establishing a solid theoretical basis for rendering, including physical correctness. Much of this work was done at the Cornell University Program of Computer Graphics; a 1997 paper from that lab describes the work done at Cornell in this area to that point.

The phrase "Physically Based Rendering" was more widely popularized by Matt Pharr, Greg Humphreys, and Pat Hanrahan in their book of the same name from 2014, a seminal work in modern computer graphics that won its authors a Technical Achievement Academy Award for special effects.

Process

PBR is, as Joe Wilson puts it, "more of a concept than a strict set of rules" – but the concept contains several distinctive points of note. One of these is that – unlike many previous models that sought to differentiate surfaces between non-reflective and reflective – PBR recognizes that, in the real world, as John Hable puts it, "everything is shiny".  Even "flat" or "matte" surfaces in the real world such as concrete will reflect a small degree of light, and many metals and liquids will reflect a great deal of it.  Another thing that PBR models attempt to do is to integrate photogrammetry - measurements from photographs of real-world materials - to study and replicate real physical ranges of values to accurately simulate albedo, gloss, reflectivity, and other physical properties.  Finally, PBR puts a great deal of emphasis on  microfacets, and will often contain additional textures and mathematical models intended to model small-scale specular highlights and cavities resulting from smoothness or roughness in addition to traditional specular or reflectivity maps.

Surfaces

PBR often utilize Bidirectional scattering distribution functions to calculate the visible light reflected at a given point on surfaces. Common techniques use approximations and simplified models that try to fit approximate models to more accurate data from other more time consuming methods or laboratory measurements (such as those of a gonioreflectometer).

As described by researcher Jeff Russell of Marmoset, a surface-focused physically based rendering pipeline may also focus on the following areas of research:
 Reflection
 Diffusion
 Translucency and transparency
 Conservation of energy
 Metallicity
 Fresnel reflection
 Microsurface scattering

Volumes

PBR is also often extended into volume renderings, with areas of research like:
 Lens-related/Angle of view/Depth of field effects
 Caustics
 Light scattering
 Participating media
 Atmospheric visual properties such as:
 Day-night cycle
 Elevation
 Angular distance from the Sun or Moon or other orbital objects
 Weather and sky conditions, including clouds, precipitation, and aerosol obscurations such as fog or haze.

Application 
Thanks to high performance and low costs of modern hardware it has become feasible to use PBR not only for industrial but also entertainment purposes wherever photorealistic images are desired, such as video games or movie making. Today's mid to high-end hardware is capable of producing and rendering PBR content and there exists a market of easy-to-use software that allows designers of all experience levels to take advantage of physically based rendering methods, such as:

 Brikl

 3ds Max
 O3DE
 OGRE
 Maya
 Babylon.js
 Blender
 Cinema 4D
 CryEngine
 Enscape
 Vue
 Godot (game engine)
 Houdini (SideFX)
  jME
 Microstation
 Minecraft GLSL Shaders
 Rhinoceros 3D
 Roblox Studio
 Sketchfab
 Stride
 Three.js
 Unigine
 Unity
 Unreal Engine 4
 Webots
A typical application provides an intuitive graphical user interface that allows artists to define and layer materials with arbitrary properties and to assign them to a given 2D or 3D object to recreate the appearance of any synthetic or organic material. Environments can be defined with procedural shaders or textures as well as procedural geometry or meshes or pointclouds. If possible all changes are made visible in real-time and therefore allow for quick iterations. Sophisticated applications allow savvy users to write custom shaders in a shading language such as HLSL or GLSL, though increasingly node-based material editors that allow a graph-based workflow with native support for important concepts such as light position, levels of reflection and emission and metallicity, and a wide range of other math and optics functions are replacing hand-written shaders for all but the most complex applications.

See also 
Non-photorealistic rendering

References

Computer graphics